NRPS may refer to:

 New Riders of the Purple Sage
 Niagara Regional Police Service
 Non Regular Permanent Staff
 Non-Ribosomal Peptide Synthetase